Trichology is the study of the hair and scalp. The term derives from Ancient Greek θρίξ (thríx), "hair"  and -λογία -logia. In most jurisdictions the title of a trichologist, not the field of trichology, is considered a para-medical discipline. 

The Institute of Trichologists was founded in 1902.  The first journal for the field, International Journal of Trichology, was founded in 2009.

Diseases
Alopecia
Alopecia areata
Alopecia universalis
Frictional alopecia
Frontal fibrosing alopecia
Loose anagen syndrome
Pattern hair loss (Androgenic alopecia)
Scarring and non scarring hair loss

Hair colour
Canities subita
Premature greying of hair

The hair root & hair follicle disorders
Telogen effluvium
Trichostasis spinulosa

Hirsutism
Trichomegaly

Pathogenic
Microsporum audouinii
Piedraia hortae
Tinea capitis
Trichobacteriosis axillaris

Diagnosis
Blood test
 Vitamin deficiency 
Hair analysis
Scalp Biopsy
Hamilton–Norwood scale & Ludwig scale
Trichoscopy

Subspecialties
Trichology includes subspecialties that deal either with certain diseases or diseases of certain parts of the hair. Some of them are:

Hair cloning

Hair removal

Management of hair loss
Hair transplantation

Cosmetic
Hair care
Curly Girl Method

Hygiene 
Dry shampoo

Treatment
Collagen induction therapy
Microneedling
Low-level laser therapy
Platelet-rich plasma
Oral or topical pharmaceuticals
 Antiandrogen or 5α-Reductase inhibitor’s
 Dutasteride, Finasteride
 Antifungal
Ketoconazole
Antihypertensive
Minoxidil

Trichology community

Associations
International Association of Trichologists (IAT) 
American Hair Research Society (AHRS)
Australasian Hair and Wool Research Society 
European Hair Research Society (EHRS)
Hair Research Society of India
Korean Hair Research Society (KHRS)
Russian Hair Research Society (RHRS)
Society for Hair Research Japan
Ukraine Hair Research Society (UHRS)
World Congress for Hair Research
The Institute of Trichologists
International Society of Hair Restoration Surgery
The Trichological Society

Journals
International Journal of Trichology
Trichology and Cosmetology

Notable trichologists
Lidia Rudnicka
Desmond Tobin
Antonella Tosti

Cosmetic
Mark Constantine
F.J. Cunningham
Philip Kingsley
Erkkie-Harris Wells

References 

 
Human hair